On the Wing is a 1986 IMAX film featuring a half-sized robotic Quetzalcoatlus'' that demonstrates principles of animal flight. Produced by the National Air and Space Museum, it also traces the early history of human flight.
 
The film is narrated by F. Murray Abraham. In one scene filmed in Florida in 1984, a reproduction Benoist airboat was flown, depicting the inaugural flight of the world's first scheduled airline, the St. Petersburg-Tampa Airboat Line, in 1914.

References

External links
 

1986 films
1986 documentary films
1986 short films
IMAX short films
Documentary films about prehistoric life
IMAX documentary films
Films scored by Richard Einhorn